Tayo the Little Bus is a South Korean computer-animated television series created by Iconix Entertainment, Educational Broadcasting System and the Metropolitan Government of Seoul. The show was produced with the help of Seoul mayor Oh Se-hoon's administration. It began airing in South Korea on EBS in 2010 and an English-dubbed version of the series began airing on Disney Junior (Asia) in 2012, with Disney Junior (Australia and New Zealand) following in 2013. In the United States and Canada, Hulu is the exclusive distributor of the series, though the third and fourth seasons are on Netflix. In Indonesia, the series is distributed by RTV, Indosiar and Mentari TV.

The series is about four buses in a city populated with anthropomorphic vehicles: Tayo (Bus 120), Rogi (Bus 1000), Lani (Bus 02), and Gani (Bus 1339).

Each episode in the start, middle, and end features a brief narration and it has six seasons. A spin-off series to Tayo, known as Titipo Titipo, premiered between the main series’ fourth season and fifth season. Titipo focuses on the titular character named Titipo, a young passenger train the show is named after along with all his friends, who are also trains. After the end of Titipos first season, Tayos fifth season premiered for English-speaking audiences on October 22, 2018. Titipo Titipo was greenlit for a second season. Titipos second season premiered for English-speaking audiences starting November 19, 2020. In late 2020, Tayo the Little Bus 10th anniversary spinoff Tayo and Little Wizards was released. This spinoff premiered on Netflix on September 17, 2021. The sixth season aired on September 1, 2021.

The series is available in Korean, English, Spanish, Japanese, Turkish, Indonesian, German, and Russian on the production company's official YouTube channel for the series.

Characters

Main characters 
The series features seven main characters. Each of the four original characters (Tayo, Gani, Lani & Rogi) is based on the four actual colors and types of Seoul Buses.
 Tayo is a friendly, playful, and sometimes mischievous blue bus. He is the 3rd largest and 3rd oldest of the four buses. In the fourth-season episode, Who Is The Real Tayo?, it is revealed that he has a clone of his named Star Tayo, which was in one of his dreams. Tayo also appears as a minor character in the Titipo Titipo series and has appeared in the Season 1 episodes: Going to Choo-Choo Town, Genie Makes a New Friend, and Titipo and Tayo. For Season 2, he appeared in the episodes: A Long Haul: Part 1, Fix and Lift's Music Battle, Loco the Fabulous Freight Train, Oh Please, Genie, Diesel and Rogi and Genie's New Friend.

 Voiced by
 Jul Kohler (A Day in the Life of Tayo (2010) - Tayo's Christmas (2014), Emergency Dispatch! Tayo and Gani (2018) - The Little Dinosaur Friend: Part 2 (2019)
 Robyn Slade (A Day in the Life of Tayo (2010) - Hana's Special Day (2014)
 Carol Tyler (The New Friend, Heart (2014) - The Little Buses' Play (2016)

 Rogi he is a conceited, outgoing, and also mischievous, but he is a good-hearted green bus. Although he and Tayo often get into fights with each other. Funny and mischievous himself, Rogi also has an interest in detective work, as can be seen in episodes like Rogi the Detective! and Prank Call Madness. Rogi appeared in Titipo Titipo's second season episodes: Oh Please, Genie, Diesel and Rogi and Genie's New Friend.

 Voiced by
 Aramis Merlin (A Day in the Life of Tayo (2010) - Tayo's Christmas (2014)
 Nolan Balzer (A Day in the Life of Tayo (2010) - Hana's Special Day (2014)
 Aidan Williams (The New Friend, Heart (2014) - The Little Dinosaur Friend: Part 2 (2019)

 Lani She is a cute girl cheerful, kind, and sweet-natured yellow bus. However, she is also timid, sensitive, and temperamental. Possessing little tolerance for arguments, she often acts as a mediator between Tayo and Rogi. She is the smallest and youngest of the four buses and is often considered the cute one of the group. Lani appeared in the second season episodes of Titipo Titipo: Fix and Lift's Music Battle, Welcome, Jenny and Oh Please, Genie.

 Voiced by
 Kami Desilets (A Day in the Life of Tayo (2010) - Hana's Special Day (2014)
 Eva Davis (The New Friend, Heart (2014) - The Little Buses' Play (2016)
 Alexis Song (Emergency Dispatch! Tayo and Gani (2018) - The Little Dinosaur Friend Part 2 (2019)

 Gani is a hardworking, warm-hearted, and shy, while also slightly timid and insecure red bus. He is the largest and oldest of the four buses and often acts as the most mature one of the group. Gani appeared in Titipo Titipo's second season episodes: Oh Please, Genie and Diesel and the Baby Cars.

 Voiced by
 Tea Wagner (Our New Friend, Gani (2010) - Tayo's Christmas (2014)
 Kerri Salki (Our New Friend, Gani (2010) - Hana's Special Day (2014), Emergency Dispatch! Tayo and Gani (2018) - The Little Dinosaur Friend Part 2 (2019)
 Ginger Hendricks (The New Friend, Heart (2014) - The Little Buses' Play (2016)
 Laura E. Chinde (Tayo Spanish (2020) - YouTube Series (2021)

 Peanut is an eco-friendly city and tour bus that is good-natured and mellow. As he is shaped just like a peanut on the top, he gains this name. He can cause mischief sometimes but is a very kind bus. He was introduced in Season 4 along with the city tram Trammy.
 Trammy is a city tram that was introduced in Season 4 along with Peanut.
 Sky is the control center and garage of Trammy, he is located on the mountain top near the reservoir and is accessible by the mountain tram and bus stop.

Supporting characters 

 Hana is a kind mechanic, who takes care of the little buses and works in the bus depot repair shop. She then appeared in Titipo Titipo in the second season episodes: Fix and Lift's Music Battle and A Gift for Teo.
 Citu (sometimes spelled Cito) is a red double-decker tour bus who serves as a father-figure for Tayo, Rogi, Lani, Gani, Peanut and Trammy. He and Hana often chastises Tayo and Rogi for driving too rough in the garage. However, in the second-season episode, Cito's Secret, it is revealed that he had a boisterous past himself. An old mentor of his, Booba, appeared in this episode.
 Heart is Hana's kind pink helper car. Previously, brown was her color in the third-season episode, The New Friend, Heart. Speed has a bit of a crush on her. Heart appeared in Titipo Titipo's second season episode: A Gift for Teo.

Frequent supporting characters 
 Nuri is a calm and professional taxi who first met Tayo in the first-season episode, A Day in the Life of Tayo. She is very nice to Tayo and his friends, often visiting them at the bus depot. She then appeared in Titipo Titipo in the second season episode: Fix and Lift's Music Battle.
 Rookie is a police officer who sometimes goofs up with his job because he is new to it.
 Pat is an experienced police car who is always serious when working. Rookie is Pat's police officer.
 Speed (whose original name was Speedy) is a red car that likes to go really fast and is a little mischievous. Speed has a bit of a crush on Heart, but she is oblivious of it. Speed later appeared in Titipo Titipo in the second season episode: Fix and Lift's Music Battle.
 Shine is an overly proud and vain yellow car who likes to show off, repeatedly leading to his own embarrassment. Shine is Speed's best friend. Shine later appeared in Titipo Titipo in the second season episode: Fix and Lift's Music Battle alongside Speed.

Recurring supporting characters 
 Toto is a yellow tow truck who is really responsible with his job. Toto also made an appearance in the Titipo Titipo season 1 episode Titipo and Tayo.
 Air is a red helicopter who is part of the rescue team.
 Bong Bong is a very chipper light blue baby van modeled after the classic VW minibus. He made his first appearance in the episode Tayo and Bong Bong. Bong Bong appeared with Oli and the other baby cars in Titipo Titipo's second season episode: Diesel and the Baby Cars. Bong Bong is also named after in social media.
 Oli is a very chipper light green baby car. His first appearance was in the second-season episode, Tayo and Bong Bong, and named for the first time in the fourth-season episode, Who Is Cooler?. Oli appeared with Bong Bong and the other baby cars in Titipo Titipo's second season episode: Diesel and the Baby Cars.
 Carry is a vehicle transporter akin to a mother or babysitter for Bongbong, Oli, an unnamed blue baby pickup truck, and an unnamed baby yellow taxi. Carry does not appear in the second season of Titipo Titipo and in season five of Tayo the little bus but Carry is also known as a male car carrier.
 Champ is a turquoise countryside Land Rover, who got praised and follows Cooku's invitation.
 Cooku (whose name was originally Coco) is a white and blue countryside bus.
 Tony also known as Cracker (not Cracker) is a little truck that obeys traffic laws and likes to teach other cars about traffic laws. In the first-season episode, I Want New Tires, he was so busy teaching other cars about traffic laws that he got late delivering Tayo's new tires to the garage. Tony appeared in Titipo Titipo in the second season episode: Fix and Lift's Music Battle.
 Alice is an ambulance who works in a hospital who likes to work with Frank when there is a fire. She is responsible for taking ill people to the hospital right on time. Alice appeared alongside Jay in Titipo Titipo's second season episode: Troublemaker Chichi.
 Frank is a fire truck who works with Alice when there is a fire. He is very serious about his job and is responsible for fighting fires and saving people in danger.
 Big is a big container truck that delivers goods to the airport to be sent overseas.
 Billy is a yellow bulldozer who works at the construction site with Poco, Chris, and Max. He is good at juggling. He appeared in Titipo Titipo in the second season episode: Oh Please, Genie.
 Poco is a yellow excavator who works at the construction site with Billy, Chris, and Max. He can rotate himself and spin his chassis around and around. He appeared in Titipo Titipo in the second season episodes: Fix and Lift's Music Battle and Oh Please, Genie.
 Chris is an orange cement truck who works at the construction site with Billy, Poco, and Max. He mixes up cement for new foundations. He shares Max's model. Max appeared in Titipo Titipo in the second season episode: Oh Please, Genie. 
 Max is a green dump truck who works at the construction site with Billy, Poco, and Chris. He can dump a huge pile of sand for a job. He shares Big and Chris's cab model. Max appeared in Titipo Titipo in the second season episodes: Fix and Lift's Music Battle and Oh Please, Genie. 
 Met is a subway train who knows about everything - even in the first-season episode, Rogi's Hiccups, he showed this by helping Rogi to stop hiccupping. If anyone feels down, Met will know what to do. He is modelled after the second generation of Korail Class 341000. Met has not appeared on the show since the 21st episode of Season 4.
 Nana is a bus living in the countryside with Ractor, Cooku, and Champ. She idolizes Tayo. She first appeared in the second-season episode, Nana Visits the City.
 Wondie is an old blue-and-beige bus who was scrapped a year before the first season, but also make cameo appearances.
 Ractor (whose name was originally Larry) is a red tractor who lives in the countryside with Cooku, Champ, and Nana.
 Rubby is a cleaning truck that likes to clean up garbage. He first appears in the second-season episode, A New Playground!.
 Iracha (sometimes mistakenly referred to as Lracha, Ratch, and Vroomy and also known as coconut in uk dub) Not coconut is a clumsy dark blue pick-up truck who shares Tony's model. He constantly makes mistakes, but knows that he is more careful, and runs on time as Jay showed him how.
 Booba is an old van that used to keep scolding Citu for constant mischief when the latter was younger. It was revealed that he used to ride with Steam in "Booba's Vacation". He then appeared in Titipo Titipo in the second season episode: Fix and Lift's Music Battle alongside Steam. 
 Ms. Teach is a car with a white-and-purple livery. With a yellow medallion on her carneck She always teaches the other vehicles in school.
 Princess Rayvelin is a princess from another planet on a spaceship who helps Tayo defeat Bully the space pirate.
 Kinder is a Kindergarten school bus who takes kids on field trips. He seemed to replace Kindy Bus. He appeared in Titipo Titipo's second season episode: Eric is the Best.
 Duri is a cheery boy who lives where Jerry used to live. He is one of Tayo's best friends.
 Jay is a rescuer and a member of the team of the emergency center. She appeared alongside Alice in Titipo Titipo's second season episode: Troublemaker Chichi.
 Joy (whose name was originally Joey) is a magician.
 Andy is an artist who formally started off as a graffiti artist but has changed his ways. He appeared in Titipo Titipo's second season episodes: We're Sorry, Eric, Eric is the Best and A Gift for Teo.
 Candy is Andy’s colorful countryside land rover truck who is very identical to champ but is colorful 
 Asura is a mischievous wizard who pulled magic pranks on the buses but has learned to make friends.
 Star Tayo is actually a fake Tayo who looks almost identical to the real Tayo.
 Star Kinder is actually a fake Kinder who looks almost identical to the real Kinder
 Jimmy is a guitarist musician who plays his guitar on the street in front of people. He appeared in Titipo Titipo's second season episode: We're Sorry, Eric alongside Jenny.
 Jenny (not to be confused with the train introduced in Titipo's second season) is a singer who she teams up with Jimmy. She appeared in Titipo Titipo's second season episode: We're Sorry, Eric alongside Jimmy.
 Hana's aunt is the aunt that Tayo meets in Hollywood, California.
 Hans is a blind musician with a seeing dog who plays the cello at a concert.
 Princess is a cat owned by the little girl.
 Blackie is a black stray dog who was found by Tayo and later gets owned by Duri.
 Miley is a famous superstar actress from Hollywood, California in the United States.
 Black is a black car agent who protects Miley.
 Titi is a mother cat who protects her baby kittens.
 Chirp-Chirp is a mother bird who builds her nest and lays three eggs and protects it.
 Lolly is a friendly tour bus that speaks with a British accent, but unlike other little buses, she lives in a different city.
 Moo Moo is the cow who blocks the road and gets in Tayo's way.
 Bird Expert is a man who's an expert on studying birds and relocating their nest.
 Santa Claus is a jolly man who rides the flying sleigh with Rudolph the red-nosed reindeer. He appeared in Titipo Titipo's second season episode: A Special Day for Diesel. He tasked and rode on Diesel to deliver presents at Christmas to and from his workshop while his steam engine sleigh was being repaired. The model is based on Steam.
 Rudolph a reindeer that can magically fly and pulls the sleigh, he is Santa Claus pet.
 Villain the leader of the Researchers on a hunt to capture Tino.
 Villain's Secret Agents are a group of secret agents who are looking for the alien T-rex baby dinosaur Tino to take it away for research.
 Professor is the boss of Villain.
 Tino is a young dinosaur. He is based on Tyrannosaurus who has telekinetic powers to lift objects off the ground.
 Tori a toy car with mouse or bear ears. He is from the film The Tayo Movie Mission: Ace.
 Blo a toy army truck with is Tori's friend. He is from the film The Tayo Movie Mission: Ace
 Anne is Hana's mother who's a paleontologist and is hunting for dinosaurs.
 Guardian X (whose name was originally Fireball) is the hero in the city.
 Thunderbolt is Guardian X's car who shares Leo's model.
 Long is a big container truck, when he first saw Tayo and his friends, he thought they would be disappointed if he had no trailer, now he can be used to being cool with or without his trailer.
 Cargo is a big plane, that can carry stuff, including cars, when he so busy running, he realized that he had forgotten to say goodbye to Tayo and his little bus friends, now he can call his friends anytime he wants to.
 Towing is an airport tow truck, she tows planes to their spots.
 Loader is an airport loader, he loads or unloads planes and trolleys.
 Tug is an airport tug, he hauls trolleys of cargo.

Characters from Titipo Titipo 
The series features four main characters.
 Titipo (voiced by Nancy Kim) is a young passenger diesel locomotive who is best friends with Genie and Diesel. He often makes mistakes, but he still wants to become the best passenger train in the world. He has colored red and white with a light sky blue lining. He also appeared in Tayo the Little Bus in the episode Tayo and Titipo's Race.
 Teo (voiced by Jason Lee) is a kind mechanic who takes care of little trains and works at the Train Production Plant. He is a fan of Super Z, and that's why he became a mechanic. In Tayo the little bus, he appeared from season 5 episode 5 "Tayo and Titipo's Race".
 Mr. Herb (voiced by Josh Schwartzentruber) is the boss of the railroad yard. In Episode 21, it is revealed that he made a lot of mistakes when he was younger. He appeared in Titipo's sister series Tayo the Little Bus alongside Steam and Diesel in the episode Booba's Vacation.
 Genie (voiced by Dami Lee) is a pink, white and gray girl electric passenger train. She loves puppies, flowers, and all things pink. She also appeared in the Tayo the Little Bus Season 5 episode: "Rogi and the Lucky Genie".
 Diesel (voiced by Mike Yantzi) is a mischievous green freight diesel locomotive. He is known for showing off and telling fictional stories and as a result, often gets into trouble with Mr. Herb. He also appeared in Tayo the Little Bus alongside Mr. Herb and Steam in the episode Booba's Vacation. He then met Tayo for the first time in the episode Titipo and Tayo.
 Xingxing (season 1 voiced by Jacqueline Youn, season 2 voiced by Sarah Park) is a shy white bullet train with a red lining similar to an ICE train. She doesn't have time to stop and talk to her friends during her shift. In the second season Titipo Titipo episode: Xingxing's Secret, she reveals that she is not good at singing so she tries to perfect that ability in an old industrial warehouse without anyone else's knowledge. In Tayo the Little Bus, she appeared from season 5 episode 5 "Tayo and Titipo's Race".
 Eric (voiced by Leo Jehn) is a blue-colored, older passenger electric locomotive. He is very mature and takes his job very seriously and as a result, has a hard time having fun with the other trains. In Tayo the little bus, he appeared from season 5 episode 5 "Tayo and Titipo's Race".
 Loco (voiced by Anna Paik) is a friendly yellow freight diesel locomotive who enjoys making new friends, and looks up to Diesel, and wants to be as good as him someday. He is also scared of the dark, as seen in S1EP23 of Titipo Titipo. In Tayo the little bus, he appeared from season 5 episode 5 "Tayo and Titipo's Race".
 Fix and Lift (Fix voiced by Matt Anipen, Lift voiced by Josh Schwartzentruber) are a duo of two yellow breakdown vehicles who love to sing and have a very hip personality, but are always ready in case of emergency. Fix is a rail-mounted crane locomotive, while Lift is a road-rail forklift.
 Tony (voiced by Mike Yantzi) is a large dark blue freight diesel locomotive who met Titipo at the Train Production Plant and brought him back there from the harbor. In S1EP19, he derailed because of a windstorm when he was heading his way to the harbor.
 Craney (voiced by John Lee) is a red chatterbox container crane who works at the harbor, known for lifting containers really fast. Although he was not in the Rail Rush series. 
 Boom-Boom (voiced by Leo Jehn) is a mischievous reddish-orange passenger train whom Titipo had to take over due to him derailing on a curve from over-speeding, which lead to Titipo taking his shift. He only appeared in the third episode of season 1 of Titipo Titipo, and it is unknown if he might appear again. Another locomotive that uses his model also appears in the Season 2 episode "Welcome, Jenny!".
 Manny and Berny (Manny voiced by John Lee, Berny voiced by Matt Anipen) are twin freight diesel locomotives who look very similar but have very different personalities. Manny is strong and tough, while Berny is shy and timid. It is also revealed that Manny has a phobia of animals while Berny has a fond nature for flowers and animals. Manny and Berny starred in one of Guardian X's film's in the second season episode: Manny and Berny are Movie Stars where Berny was given the part after auditioning. However, due to his shyness with his voice in his role, it was given to Manny as his voice stood out. Berny felt left out and after talking to his brother for a bit and with the help of Jenny, they came up with a plan where Berny would still do his role, but instead Manny would lend his voice to Berny for the Guardian X's film. This plan was successful. 
 Setter (voiced by Leo Jehn) is a bluish-green diesel shunter who is very organized with his job, being capable of handling and sorting all of the rolling stock. It is also revealed that he likes to spend his day off all by himself. 
 Steam (voiced by Mike Yantzi) is an old-fashioned steam locomotive whom Titipo saved from scrap. He is very old and loves to tell stories to the younger trains. He appeared in Titipo's sister series Tayo the Little Bus alongside Mr. Herb and Diesel in the episode Booba's Vacation.
 Danny (voiced by Mike Yantzi) is a blue track inspection car who usually works at night. In S1EP23 of Titipo Titipo, he tries to calm Loco down during his night shift.
 Jenny (voiced by Bommie Catherine Han) is a female freight diesel locomotive who was resembling an EMD F-unit, who first appeared in the second season episode A Long Haul Part 2 and moved permanently to Choo-Choo Town.
 Super Z (voiced by Matt Anipen) is Guardian X's train who reuses Tony's model, appearing in the S2 episode, "A Gift For Teo".

Reception
At a Vietnamese seminar for addressing the struggles of the Vietnamese animation industry, Korean animators named Tayo the Little Bus a series that has been "dominating" the Korean market. These animators also noted that the series is popular in China, Thailand, and Vietnam.

Cultural impact

In 2014, the Seoul Metropolitan Government commissioned buses designed as the characters Tayo, Gani, Rogi, and Lani, to run around the Gwanghwamun Square area of the city. This was done as part of an initiative to teach children how to use the bus. The initiative was a massive success, drawing crowds of over 40,000 in a single day. People from all across the country came to see the buses. Although the buses were originally set to run from March 26 until Public Transport Day at the end of April, their popularity led to an extension until Children's Day on May 5. The number of buses was also expanded from the original four to 100. In wake of this success, it was reported that the local governments of other cities in South Korea were considering adopting the campaign. Officials for the city of Seoul initially opposed this on copyright grounds, but they consented in April to letting other cities use the characters for non-commercial purposes.

Jaeyeon Woo of The Wall Street Journal'''s blog Korea Real-Time, speculated in an April 2014 article that the success of this initiative led both of Gyeonggi Province's gubernatorial candidates, Kim Sang-gon and Nam Kyung-pil, to adopt public transportation issues as a key part of their campaign platforms. Seoul-mayor Park Won-soon, who began the initiative, has been criticized by some of his political rivals, who feel that he took credit for the series, even though the series was begun by his predecessor's administration.

On October 16, 2014, a South Korean group called the Teen Astronauts, launched a space balloon designed as the character Tayo from the Space Science Park in Korea's National Science Museum.

In late 2018 there's a Tayo bus phenomenon in Indonesia due to its theme song, often used as a joke or prank by many people. It become one of the 15 top trending searches in Google in Indonesia in 2018. A BRT system in Banjarmasin, South Kalimantan is called "Tayo bus" due to its size and color.

Spin-off SeriesThe Tayo Movie: Mission Ace (2016)Tayo's Vroom Vroom Adventure (2017)Tayo's Toy Adventure (2019)Tayo Dino Kingdom Adventure (2019)
Tayo and Little Wizards (2021)

 Tayo's Sing Along Show Tayo's Sing Along Show'' is an animation program that aired on EBS in the first season from July 5 to September 27, 2013, and the second season from July 3 to September 25, 2015. It is an extra work of Tayo. The program is a new type of animation in which children's friend, Tayo, the Little Bus, decorates an exciting song with various car friends.

References

External links 

Tayo the Little Bus at EBS

2010 South Korean television series debuts
2021 South Korean television series endings
South Korean children's animated comedy television series
Computer-animated television series
Korean-language television shows
English-language television shows
Animated preschool education television series
2010s preschool education television series
2020s preschool education television series
Animated television series about auto racing
Buses in fiction